In the 2001–2002 Heineken Cup pool stage matches, teams received 
2 points for a win 
1 point for a draw

Pool 1

Pool 2

Pool 3

Pool 4

Pool 5

Pool 6

Seeding

See also
2001-02 Heineken Cup

References

pool
Heineken Cup pool stages